Dalcahue  is a port city and a commune in Chiloé Province, on Chiloé Island, Los Lagos Region, Chile.

Demographics
At that time, there were 5,420 men and 5,273 women. The population grew by 37.7% (2,931 persons) between the 1992 and 2002 censuses.

Administration
As a commune, Dalcahue is a third-level administrative division of Chile administered by a municipal council, headed by an alcalde who is directly elected every four years. The 2008-2012 alcalde is Alfredo Hurtado Alvarez (PDC).

Within the electoral divisions of Chile, Dalcahue is represented in the Chamber of Deputies by Gabriel Ascencio (PDC) and Alejandro Santana (RN) as part of the 58th electoral district, together with Castro, Ancud, Quemchi, Curaco de Vélez, Quinchao, Puqueldón, Chonchi, Queilén, Quellón, Chaitén, Hualaihué, Futaleufú and Palena. The commune is represented in the Senate by Camilo Escalona Medina (PS) and Carlos Kuschel Silva (RN) as part of the 17th senatorial constituency (Los Lagos Region).

Transportation
The city is served by the Mocopulli Airport that connects the Chiloé island with the rest of Chile

Gallery

See also
Quíquel

References

External links
  Municipality of Dalcahue

Communes of Chile
Populated places in Chiloé
Populated places in Chiloé Province